Janet Tashjian is an American writer living in Los Angeles. Her children's and young adult fiction is published by Henry Holt and Company. Her books often incorporate different formats and play with the line between fiction and non-fiction. She is the mother of Jake Tashjian, who illustrated her My Life and Einstein the Class Hamster series.

Books

Stand-alone fiction 
 1997: Tru Confessions (which was adapted for a 2002 Disney Channel Original Movie: Tru Confessions)
 1999: Multiple Choice
1999: Felicity: Summer
2003: Fault Line
 2012: For What It's Worth

Larry series 
 2001: The Gospel According to Larry
 2004: Vote for Larry
 2008: Larry and the Meaning of Life

My Life series 
 2010: My Life as a Book
 2011: My Life as a Stuntman
 2013: My Life as a Cartoonist
 2014: My Life as a Joke
 2015: My Life as a Gamer
 2017: My Life as a Ninja
 2018: My Life as a YouTuber
 2019: My Life as a Meme
 2020: My Life as a Coder
 2021: My Life as a Billionaire
 2022: My Life as a Tik Tok Star

Einstein the Class Hamster series 
 2013: Einstein the Class Hamster
 2014: Einstein the Class Hamster and the Very Real Game Show
 2015: Einstein the Class Hamster Saves the Library

Sticker Girl series 
 2016: Sticker Girl
 2017: Sticker Girl Rules the School
 2018: Sticker Girl and the Cupcake Challenge

Marty Frye, Private Eye series 
 2017: Marty Frye, Private Eye
 2017: Marty Frye, Private Eye: The Case of the Stolen Poodle
 2018: Marty Frye, Private Eye: The Case of the Busted Video Games

Adaptations 
Tashjian's works have been translated into several languages. Her novel Tru Confessions was adapted into a 2002 Disney Channel Original Movie starring Clara Bryant and Shia LaBeouf.

References

External links

Official site
Author biography at Macmillan Books

American children's writers
Living people
1956 births
American women novelists
20th-century American novelists
20th-century American women writers
American people of Armenian descent
21st-century American novelists
21st-century American women writers